Souvenirs is the second studio solo album by the American rock singer-songwriter Dan Fogelberg. The album was released in late 1974, on the label Epic Records. The album reached No. 17 on the Billboard 200 in March 1975 and was certified double platinum by the RIAA. Joe Walsh produced the album and played on ten of the eleven tracks.

Reception
Reviewing retrospectively for AllMusic, critic Stephen J. Matteo wrote of the album "Dan Fogelberg expanded slightly on his sparse, countrified folk sound, adding a distinctively more pop feel, thanks to help from producer Joe Walsh."

Track listing

Personnel
 Dan Fogelberg – lead vocals, acoustic guitar, organ, acoustic piano (except on 9 and 10), electric guitar (1, 2, 7), vibraphone (2), percussion (8, 11), Moog synthesizer (8, 11), zither (11)
 Joe Walsh – electric 12-string guitar (1), acoustic 12-string guitar (1–4), electric 6-string guitar (2–11), ARP bass (5), backing vocals (6, 10)
 Gerry Beckley – acoustic guitar (11)
 Al Perkins – pedal steel guitar (2, 4), banjo (9)
 Russ Kunkel – drums (except on 4), congas (3), percussion (3)
 Don Henley – drums (4), backing vocals (4, 10)
 Joe Lala – congas (1), timbales (1), tambourine (4)
 Kenny Passarelli – bass, banjo (1–4, 7, 11), sousaphone (11)
 Bryan Garofalo – bass (6, 9, 10)
 Paul Harris – string arrangements (6), acoustic piano (9, 10)
 Jimmie Haskell – accordion (5), string quartet arrangement (5)
 Graham Nash – harmony vocals (1, 6)
 Glenn Frey – backing vocals (10)
 The Front Line Gardenia Choir (Don Henley, Randy Meisner, Jody Boyer and Marie Ouhrabka) – choir (11)

Production
 Producer – Joe Walsh
 Engineers – Allan Blazek, Fritz Richmond, John Stranoch and Bill Szymczyk
 Recorded at Record Plant and Elektra Sound Recorders (Los Angeles, CA).
 Mixing – John Stranoch 
 Mastered by Rick Collins at Kendun Recorders (Burbank, CA).
 Art Direction and Design – Gary Burden
 Photography – Henry Diltz
 Inside Painting – Dan Fogelberg
 Direction – Irving Azoff

Charts
Album – Billboard (United States)

Singles – Billboard (United States)

References

Dan Fogelberg albums
1974 albums
Albums produced by Joe Walsh
Epic Records albums